Robinson Ekspeditionen 2011 (also known as Robinson: All or Nothing) was the fourteenth season of the Danish version of the Swedish television series Expedition Robinson. This season premiered on September 5, 2011. The first twist this season was that the tribe that lost the first immunity challenge was to be forced to live on the desolate side of the island while the winning tribe lived on a side of the island that had many luxuries and comforts. The only thing separating the two tribes was a wall. The losing tribe was also forced to take part in a large elimination in which half of the tribe will be eliminated from the game (this was later revealed to be a trick as the four people voted out switched tribes). Among the contestants this season will be siblings Karina Andersen and Maria Bruun, who'll be on the same tribe but will keep their relationship a secret from the other contestants. As another twist, this year there was no "Utopia", instead eliminated contestants may be sent to "Guardian Island". On the island eliminated contestants will be forced to battle three guardians of a golden skull for a spot on the island. In episode 2 the two cousins, Hugo and Morten Kleister, entered the game as jokers and joined the recently cut-in-half North team. In episode 3, another joker, Mie Deichmann Jørgensen, also joined the North team, thought shortly after she was voted out of the game. In the same episode another joker, Daniel Broner Jensen, entered the game as a member of the South team, though he too was voted out shortly after due to his poor relationship with some of the other South team members (specifically Allan). In episode 6, the remaining contestants were asked if they wanted to switch tribes. While only Louise Valbjørn opted to do this, her move proved to be both strategic and game changing as she was able to successfully throw the immunity challenge to her old tribe and convince members of her new tribe to vote out Nima Alijana Hassanlouei. In episode 7, four more jokers, Kit Ruprecht, Marlene Thinggaard, Nicolai Barden, and Zabrina Kondrup, entered the game. Zabrina was well known for her participation in the previous season of Robinson. In episode 8, the guards protecting the golden skull were told that they had to "curse" a contestant. Said contestant would be given a mission to complete and if they failed they would automatically be eliminated from the competition. They chose Brigitte who ultimately passed her mission and was allowed to eliminate two of her fellow competitors (she chose Katrine and Kit). The final three contestants, Marlene Thinggaard and Hugo and Morten Kleister, took part in a final challenge which would determine the winner. Ultimately, Hugo Kleister beat out his cousin Morten and Marlene Thinggaard to win the grand prize of 250,000 Danish krones. At the end of the season, the three final guardians, all of whom had a key to the cage of the skull, took possession of the skull and with it half of the 500,000 krones prize to split among the four of them. This, however, would not have been true should the guardians have failed their final duel against Hugo, the actual winner of the season. Per faced Hugo in the final duel and won the 250,000 Danish krones for himself and fellow Guardians Patricia Beck, Tommy Kristensen, and Zabrina Kondrup.

Finishing order

Guardian Island

Reference List

External links

Robinson Ekspeditionen seasons
Danish reality television series
2011 Danish television seasons